Mashwani (also  Mishwani, Meshwani, or  Moshwani) is Arab origin tribe mainly settled in different parts of Pakistan and Afghanistan, in addition to some other neighboring regions. They are Afghans by adoption and Arabs by descent. They use Mashwani, Banuri, Ludin, Kazmi (due to Ali al Kadhim bin Ismail Araj), Roghani, Jafari as their surnames. Mashwanis played a vital role in fighting against Sikh Khalsa army.

Demographics 
Mashwanis are mainly settled in some parts of Afghanistan, Pakistan, Iran.

 In Afghanistan they live in Konar and Ghazni provinces. 
 In Pakistan they are settled in different cities of all provinces. The majority of them live in Swabi, Mardan, Peshawar, Sirikot, Dir, Kohat, Gadwalian, D I Khan of Khyber Pakhtunkhwa province; Panjpai, Panjgur, Chaman and  Quetta cities of Baluchistan province; Shakargarh, Faisalabad and Sarghodahh cities of Punjab; and in the Karachi city of Sindh province.
 In Iran Mashwanis live in Zahedan city of  Sistan and Baluchestan Province.

Culture 
Mashwanis are very friendly and are famous for their hospitality. The majority of Mashwanis are Pashto speakers, hence follow Pakhtun culture and adhere to the Pakhtunwali codes. They wear pashtun traditional dress shalwar kameez. Women cover their head with a shawl while males usually wear kufi, Peshawari cap, turban, Sindhi cap, or pakul as traditional headgear and Peshawari Chappal as footwear. They are Muslims and follow Islam as their religion.

Progenitor of the Mashwani Tribe 
Syed Muhammad Kalan also known as Gesudaraz I (because of his long hair) was born in village Kollan of Dalgan, Sistan and Baluchistan province of Iran. He was the Prince of Persia or "Governor of Persia". He  sided  from  Iran  to Sulayman  Mountain and settled among the Afghans, and fixed his residence between the Kakar, Shirani  and Karlani . These three tribes enjoyed his blessed presence, and, learning from him the fundamental truths of Islam. The commanders of  these Pashtuns tribes (Kakar, Shirani  and Karlani) had  presented  their  daughters  to him  in  respect  of  his  family  and  mysticism. He  married  women from  each tribe  and had sons, Sherani woman had the son known as, "Storyani". Karlani woman had two Sons known as, Wardak and Hanni, Wardak and Hanni were the Sons of Syed Gesudaraz from His Wife Karlani Woman,who were known as progenitors of  these tribes. The  Arab  tribes  descended  from  Gesudaraz I sons  are  using  his  sons  titles  as  there  "surnames". Mashwani was son of Gesudaraz I from his Kakar wife Sher Bano. Syed Muhammad Kalan (Gesu daraz I) was performing Fajr prayer when his maid came and gave him news about the birth of his son, Syed titled him "Mashwani" which means light of education or "Feather and Inkpot". Mashwani had nine sons, Tukuz, Lodin, Matakati, Suleiman, Roghani, Kazbuli, Ghareb, Khar bari, and Diaz.

Ancestor 
Mashwanis are descended from the Islamic Prophet Muhammad, through his daughter Syeda Fatima-tuz-Zahra and Ali Ibn-e-Abu Talib.
Syeda Fatima-tuz-Zahra 605-632 AD w/o Ali Ibn-e-Abu Talib
Imam Hussain ibn Ali 625-680
Imam Ali (Zain-ul-Abideen, Sajjad) 659-713
Imam Muhammad Baqir 676–733
Ja'far al-Sadiq 702–765
 Isma'il ibn Jafar 719–755. Fatima bint al-Hussain'l-Athram bin al-Hasan bin Ali (mother)
 Ali ibn Ismail 752-856
 Syed Faateh (Syed-al-Rajal)
 Syed Qaim
 Syed Qaaf
 Syed Omar
 Syed Ghafar (Yousaf)
 Syed Muhammad Kalan (Gesudaraz I) 907-999. 
 Syed Muhammad Masood (Mashwani 959-1016). Brothers: Syed Muhammad Sani (Storyani), Syed Abbas (Wardak), Syed Fakhruddin (Hanni)

Descendants of the Mashwani are considered to carry the unchanged y chromosome of Prophet Muhammad through the males. It is traced from Ali Ibn-e-abu Talib, the spouse of Fatima al Zahra. His father Abu Talib ibn Abd al-Muttalib, who was the brother of Prophet Muhammad's father. This means they all shared the same y-chromosome passed through unchanged only to the male children of this lineage.

Notable Mashwanis 

 Sheikh Syed Adam Banuri was a famous Sufi scholar in the 16th century, and is known as the progenitor of Benuri tribe. He traces back his own roots to Mashwani in his own book titled "Nikatul Asrar". He wrote a book on the teaching of the Mujadddid and the Naqshbandiyya entitled Kalimatul Ma Arif, two of his other works, the Khulasatu Ma Arif and the Nikatul Asrar, were among other well-known works on Sufi teachings and on the importance of the Naqshbandiyya order. Sayed Adam Banoori was the first to spread the Mujaddid teachings in the Hijaz. Muhammad Yousuf Banuri was one of his grandchildren, was also a famous Islamic scholar, founder of Jamia Uloom-ul-Islamia and former President of Wifaq ul Madaris Al-Arabia, Pakistan. A town in Karachi city was renamed as Allama Banuri town in honor of the known hadith scholar Muhammad Yousuf Banuri.
 Sirajul Haq is a famous Pakistani politician.
 Pir Sabir Shah is a former chief minister of Khyber Pakhtunkhwa and a famous Pakistani Politician.
 Iftikhar Ali Mushwani, a Pakistani politician.

References 

10th-century Afghan people